Niel Hornbuckle (born 24 September 1991) is a South African cricketer. He was included in the South Western Districts cricket team for the 2016 Africa T20 Cup. In September 2018, he was named in South Western Districts' squad for the 2018 Africa T20 Cup.

References

External links
 

1991 births
Living people
South African cricketers
South Western Districts cricketers
Cricketers from Bloemfontein